Moster is a former municipality in the old Hordaland county, Norway. The municipality existed from 1916 until 1963, when it was merged into the new, larger municipality of Bømlo.  The administrative centre of the municipality was the village of Mosterhamn, where the Old Moster Church is located (the oldest surviving stone church in Norway).  The  municipality encompassed the southeastern part of the island of Bømlo and the island of Moster as well as many surrounding islets.

History
The municipality of Moster was established on 1 July 1916 when the old municipality of Finnås was split into the three new municipalities: Moster (population: 1,316), Bømlo (population: 1,217), and Bremnes (population: 3,411). During the 1960s, there were many municipal mergers across Norway due to the work of the Schei Committee. On 1 January 1963, the three municipalities of Moster (population: 1,834), Bømlo (population: 1,463), and Bremnes (population: 4,829) were merged into a new, larger Bømlo Municipality.

Government
The municipal council  of Moster was made up of 17 representatives that were elected to four year terms.  The party breakdown of the final municipal council was as follows:

See also
List of former municipalities of Norway

References

Bømlo
Former municipalities of Norway
1916 establishments in Norway
1963 disestablishments in Norway